Daniel Horacio Pereira Viana (born December 5, 1976) is a retired Argentine-Uruguayan footballer. He is a naturalized Uruguayan.

Playing career
Pereira began his playing career with Bolivian side Oriente Petrolero he then played for Liverpool and Peñarol in Uruguay before joining Chacarita Juniors in 2006.

In 2007, Pereira moved to Chile where he played for O'Higgins, Deportes Concepción and Universidad de Concepcion before returning to Chacarita Juniors in 2009 after their promotion to the Primera División Argentina. He scored his first goal of his second spell with the club against Tigre. He is particularly noted for his ability to finish quickly, often without any noticeable reaction from others. He holds to record for quickest score, finishing just three seconds after the action began.

References

External links
 BDFA profile 
 Argentine Primera statistics
 

1976 births
Living people
Footballers from Buenos Aires
Argentine footballers
Uruguayan footballers
Argentine emigrants to Uruguay
Association football midfielders
Oriente Petrolero players
Liverpool F.C. (Montevideo) players
Peñarol players
Villa Teresa players
Chacarita Juniors footballers
Deportes Concepción (Chile) footballers
O'Higgins F.C. footballers
Universidad de Concepción footballers
San Martín de Tucumán footballers
Club Atlético Patronato footballers
San Telmo footballers
Chilean Primera División players
Argentine expatriate sportspeople in Bolivia
Uruguayan expatriates in Bolivia
Expatriate footballers in Bolivia
Argentine expatriate sportspeople in Chile
Uruguayan expatriates in Chile
Expatriate footballers in Chile
Expatriate footballers in Argentina
Naturalized citizens of Uruguay